Micești is a commune in Argeș County, Muntenia, Romania. It is composed of four villages: Brânzari, Micești, Păuleasca, and Purcăreni.

It lies on the banks of Râul Doamnei, where the river receives its tributary, the Micești River; another tributary, the river Budeasa, flows through Brânzari village.

It has the following neighbors Mălureni and  Coșești communes to the north, Dârmănești commune to the northeast, the town of Mioveni to the east, Mărăcineni commune to the south, and Budeasa commune to the west.

Purcăreni village is crossed by the national road DN73, which connects Pitești to the city of Brașov, in Transylvania. Micești village is traversed by county road DJ740, which leads south to Mărăcineni (where it also ends in DN73), and north to Păuleasca village, from where it continues to Mălureni.

Natives
 Emanoil Bârzotescu (1888–1968), major general during World War II.

References

Communes in Argeș County
Localities in Muntenia